Robert Benjamin Rhoades (born November 22, 1945), also known as The Truck Stop Killer, is an American serial killer and rapist.  In 1994, Rhoades was convicted of the first degree murder of Regina Kay Walters and was slated to be tried for two more before charges were dropped due to the wishes of victims' families. Rhoades is additionally suspected of torturing, raping, and killing more than 50 women between 1975 and 1990, based on data about his truck routes and women who went missing during those years and who met the profile of his preferred victims. At the time he was caught, Rhoades claimed to have engaged in these activities for 15 years.

Early life 
Robert Benjamin Rhoades was born in Council Bluffs, Iowa in 1945, but it is uncertain as to exactly where he was raised. He was raised by his mother in the early years of his life, as his father was a soldier in the United States Army and was stationed in West Germany. Rhoades was attending elementary school when his father returned from duty overseas. After his father was discharged from the military, he found work as a firefighter.

By all reliable accounts, Rhoades' early life was relatively normal, aside from unspecified social problems in his formative years. He was an active participant in the extracurricular activities of his attended schools, and involved himself with various sports and other programs, including gridiron football, wrestling, choir and French club. Rhoades' criminal involvement during his high school years were only notable for an arrest in 1961, at age 16, for tampering with a vehicle, along with an arrest for public fighting in 1962 at age 17.

After graduating from Thomas Jefferson High School in Council Bluffs in 1964, he joined the Marine Corps. During the same year, his father was arrested for molesting a 12-year-old girl, and subsequently committed suicide while awaiting trial. A few years later, in 1967 or 1968, Rhoades was dishonorably discharged from the military for his involvement in a robbery.

After his dishonorable discharge from the Marines at some time in the late 1960s, he attended college but dropped out. He later attempted to join a law enforcement agency, but was likely rejected for his past dishonorable discharge from the Marine Corps. Throughout the 1970s and 1980s Rhoades married three times, having a son with his first wife. Subsequently, he found work in stores, supermarkets, warehouses and restaurants. Eventually, he became a long haul trucker. 

During the 1980s, Rhoades developed interests and hobbies, amongst which included involving himself in the BDSM scene. It was also during this time he allegedly verbally, physically and sexually abused his third wife, Deborah Rhoades.

Murders 
Rhoades preyed on hitchhikers and truckstop sex workers, starting in the 1970s. 

His first confirmed victims were Patricia Candace Walsh and her husband, Douglas Zyskowski, in January 1990. The couple were hitchhiking when Rhoades picked them up in his truck while on a long-haul journey. He immediately killed Zyskowski and dumped his body in Sutton County, Texas, where it was later found. He was not identified until 1992. He kept Walsh for over a week. During this time, he tortured and raped her numerous times before dumping her body in Millard County, Utah. 

Almost a month after Walsh's death, he abducted an 18-year-old victim, Shana Holts, who escaped and informed police. When Rhoades was detained, the victim declined to press charges, feeling that she would not be believed despite extensive evidence. In her statement to police she said that "I don't see any good in filing charges. It's just going to be my word against his. If there was any evidence, I would file. I would file charges and sue him." 

It was later asserted that she was fearful of Rhoades after enduring two weeks in his truck. Rhoades had converted the sleeper cab of his truck into his own personal torture chamber where he kept women, sometimes for weeks, torturing and raping them.

Regina Kay Walters, 14, was found nude and badly decomposed, on September 29, 1990, in the loft of an abandoned barn near Greenville. She had been missing since February 3, 1990, when she ran away from her home in Pasadena with her boyfriend, Ricky Lee Jones, 20. An autopsy revealed she had been strangled to death sometime in early March. A photograph of Walters being tortured was found in the home of Rhoades.

On May 26, 1990, the partial skeleton of Ricky Lee Jones was found near Harleton. He had been shot in the head.

In the early morning of April 1, 1990, Trooper Mike Miller of the Arizona Highway Patrol found a truck with its hazard lights on at the side of I-10 near Casa Grande, Arizona. When he investigated inside the cab, he discovered a nude woman, later identified as Kathleen Vine, handcuffed and screaming. There was also a male present who identified himself as the driver of the truck. After failing to talk his way out of the situation, Rhoades turned over a gun which had been on his person. He was arrested and charged with aggravated assault, sexual assault, and unlawful imprisonment. He was left handcuffed in Miller's patrol car, but nearly escaped. 

After further investigation, the arresting detective, Rick Barnhart, was able to make a connection to the Houston case and noticed a pattern stretching over the course of at least five months. In executing a search warrant for Rhoades' home, police found photos of a nude teenager who was later identified as Walters, whose body was found in September 1990. Also present were photos of Walsh, whose body was discovered that October.

Conviction 
In 1994, Rhoades was convicted of the first degree murder of Regina Kay Walters and sentenced to life without parole at Menard Correctional Center in Chester, Illinois. He was extradited to Utah in 2005 to be tried for the deaths of Candace Walsh and Douglas Zyskowski; however, in accordance with the victims' families' requests, the charges were dropped in 2006, so that they would not be required to testify more than once (for both states) and he was returned to prison. Rhoades later was extradited to Texas for the murder of Walters and Jones where Rhoades, in exchange for dropping the death penalty, pleaded guilty to their deaths and received a second life sentence. Rhoades continues serving his life without parole sentence at the maximum-security Menard Correctional Center in Chester, Illinois.

Books and films

Books

Films
Midnight in the Switchgrass

See also 
List of serial killers by number of victims
List of serial killers in the United States

References 

1945 births
20th-century American criminals
American male criminals
American murderers of children
American people convicted of murder
American prisoners sentenced to life imprisonment
American rapists
American serial killers
American truck drivers
Living people
Male serial killers
Murder in Illinois
Murder in Texas
People convicted of murder by Illinois
People from Council Bluffs, Iowa
Prisoners sentenced to life imprisonment by Illinois
Torture in the United States
Violence against women in the United States